Hispanotherium was a genus of rhinoceros of the tribe Elasmotheriini endemic to Europe and Asia during the Miocene living from 16—7.25 mya existing for approximately .

Taxonomy
Hispanotherium was erected by Crusafont and Villalta (1947) for the nominal species "Rhinoceros" matritense. The Asian form Huaqingtherium was once assigned to Hispanotherium, but was eventually recognized as distinct.

References

Miocene rhinoceroses
Miocene mammals of Europe
Prehistoric rhinoceroses